Aboriginal English can refer to

 Australian Aboriginal English
 Aboriginal English in Canada